Karel Sedláček (born 17 February 1979) is a Czech darts player.

Career
Sedláček qualified for the 2014 BDO World Darts Championship playing Paul Hogan in the preliminary round, losing 1–3. He qualified for the 2014 BDO World Trophy, won in the first round 6–1 over Robbie Green, then lost in the last 16 to Paul Jennings 2–7. He qualified for the 2015 BDO World Darts Championship, playing Paul Coughlin in the preliminary round; he won 3–2. He lost 1–3 to Glen Durrant in the first round, with the highest average - 99.58 - in all the first round matches, and the third-highest average for a match loser in Lakeside history.

In 2018 Sedláček qualified for the Dutch Darts Championship in Maastricht. He won the East European qualifier to qualify for the 2019 PDC World Darts Championship, his first qualification for that event.

Following a 3–0 defeat to Keegan Brown at the World Championship, he went on to qualify for the 2019 German Darts Grand Prix in Munich. Wins over Diogo Portela, Ian White and Darren Webster saw Sedláček reach the quarter-finals, where he went down 6–5 to Max Hopp.

Sedláček was also able to qualify for his home tournament, the 2019 Czech Darts Open, where he was eventually beaten in the second round 6-4 by Ian White.

On 18 January 2020, he beat Berry van Peer in the final of day three at European Q-School to win a PDC Tour Card for the first time. Sedláček will play on the ProTour in 2020 and 2021.

At the UK Open 2021 Sedláček won 6:0 straight against Rhys Griffin but was then eliminated 7:10 against Simon Whitlock. But Sedláček was denied another Major participation. On the PDC Pro Tour Sedláček reached at most the last 16 whereupon he lost his Tour Card and has to start at Q-School 2022. As a former Tour cardholder he started in the final stage, but he didn't win his Tour Card back.

World Championship results

BDO
 2014: Preliminary round (lost to Paul Hogan 1–3)
 2015: First round (lost to Glen Durrant 1–3)

PDC
 2019: First round (lost to Keegan Brown 0–3)
 2021: First round (lost to Ryan Joyce 2–3)
 2023: Second round (lost to Dirk van Duijvenbode 2–3)

Performance timeline 

PDC European Tour

External links

References

Living people
Czech darts players
British Darts Organisation players
Professional Darts Corporation current tour card holders
1979 births
PDC World Cup of Darts Czech team
People from Náchod
Sportspeople from the Hradec Králové Region